Joshua Ezeudu (born September 19, 1999) is an American football guard for the New York Giants of the National Football League (NFL). He played college football at North Carolina.

Early life and high school
Ezeudu was born to a Nigerian family, and grew up in Lawrenceville, Georgia and attended Archer High School. Ezeudu was rated a three-star recruit and committed to play college football at North Carolina over offers from Colorado State, Connecticut, and Missouri.

College career
Ezeudu played in one game during his true freshman season before redshirting the rest of the year. He became the Tar Heels' starting left guard midway through his redshirt freshman season. Ezeudu started ten games during his redshirt sophomore year and was named third-team All-Atlantic Coast Conference (ACC). He played in all 12 of UNC's games with 11 starts as a redshirt junior and was named honorable mention All-ACC. After the season, Ezeudu announced that he would forgo his remaining collegiate eligibility and enter the 2022 NFL Draft.

Professional career

Ezeudu was drafted by the New York Giants with the 67th pick in the third round of the 2022 NFL Draft.

References

External links
 New York Giants bio
North Carolina Tar Heels bio

Living people
American football offensive guards
North Carolina Tar Heels football players
American sportspeople of Nigerian descent
People from Lawrenceville, Georgia
Players of American football from Georgia (U.S. state)
Sportspeople from the Atlanta metropolitan area
New York Giants players
1999 births